The 1939 Cork Senior Hurling Championship was the 51st staging of the Cork Senior Hurling Championship since its establishment by the Cork County Board in 1887. The draw for the opening round fixtures took place at the Cork County Convention on 29 January 1939. The championship began on 19 March 1939 and ended on 15 October 1939.

Glen Rovers were the defending champions.

On 15 October 1939, Glen Rovers won the championship following a 5-04 to 2-05 defeat of Blackrock in the final. This was their sixth championship title overall and the sixth of eight successive championships.

Results

Divisional section

First round

Second round

Semi-finals

Final

References

Cork Senior Hurling Championship
Cork Senior Hurling Championship